Kasper Waarts Høgh (born 6 December 2000) is a Danish professional footballer who plays as a forward for Norwegian Eliteserien side Stabæk, on loan from Danish Superliga club AaB.

Club career

Randers FC
In December 2017, Høgh signed a new contract with Randers FC, extending his contract until 2020. Høgh's first experience on the first team squad was on 4 April 2018, when he was selected to the squad against Silkeborg IF in the Danish Cup.

Høgh got his debut for Randers FC on 15 April 2018. He started on the bench, but replaced Mikael Boman in the 80th minute in a 0–3 defeat against OB in the Danish Superliga. He played one more game for the first team squad in that season. Høgh had scored impressive 23 goals in 21 games for the U19 squad in that season.

He continued in the 2018/19 season to impress, scoring 14 goals in 9 games for the U19 squad in the first half year. Høgh became more and more involved in the first team squad, playing two games coming in as a substitute and sitting on the bench for 4 games in the first half year of the season.

On 19 March 2019, Høgh signed a long-term contract with Randers. He was set to be permanently promoted to the first team from the 2019/20 season. After an injury, Randers decided on 29 July 2020 to loan Høgh out to Icelandic club Valur for the rest of 2020, to get some regular match fitness.

Hobro IK
On 18 June 2021, Høgh signed a three-year deal with Danish 1st Division club Hobro IK. Høgh made a total of 12 appearances for the club, scoring four goals.

AaB
On 14 January 2022 it was reported, that Høgh had gone to Malta for a training camp with AaB. Later in the same month, on 21 January, Høgh's transfer to the Danish Superliga club AaB was confirmed, signing a deal until June 2026. Høgh got his debut for AaB on 20 February 2022 against FC Midtjylland, scoring the second goal in a 2-0 win.

On 18 January 2023, Høgh joined newly promoted Norwegian Eliteserien side Stabæk on a year-long loan deal with a purchase option.

Honours
Randers
Danish Cup: 2020–21

References

External links
 
 Kasper Høgh at DBU 

2000 births
Living people
Danish men's footballers
Danish expatriate men's footballers
Association football forwards
Denmark youth international footballers
Sportspeople from the Central Denmark Region
People from Randers
Danish Superliga players
Randers FC players
Valur (men's football) players
Hobro IK players
AaB Fodbold players
Stabæk Fotball players
Danish expatriate sportspeople in Iceland
Danish expatriate sportspeople in Norway
Expatriate footballers in Iceland
Expatriate footballers in Norway